Edward Grey may refer to:

 Edward Grey, 1st Viscount Grey of Fallodon (1862–1933), British Liberal Foreign Secretary in First World War
 Edward Grey, 1st Viscount Lisle (died 1492), English nobleman who was created Viscount Lisle in 1483
 Eddie Grey (1918–2004), Sri Lankan sportsman and police officer
 Edward Grey (bishop) (1782–1837), Anglican clergyman
 Edward Grey (died 1676) (1611–1676), English politician
 Sir Edward Grey, a fictional character in the Hellboy universe
 Ned Grey (1896–1974), hurler

See also
 Edward Gray (disambiguation)
 Ted Grey, writer
 Edmund Grey (disambiguation)